Cable Canyon is a valley on the south slope of the San Bernardino Mountains in San Bernardino County, California.

References

Valleys of San Bernardino County, California